Halichoeres malpelo, or the Malpelo wrasse, is a species of saltwater wrasse found in the Eastern Central Pacific Ocean.

References

malpelo
Taxa named by Gerald R. Allen
Taxa named by David Ross Robertson
Fish described in 1992